General Order No. 11 may refer to:

General Order No. 11 (1862), General Ulysses S. Grant's order during the American Civil War that all Jews in his district be expelled.
General Order No. 11 (1863), Brigadier General Ewing's order that civilians living in several counties of Missouri be expelled and their lands burned.